George Beswick Hynson, Sr. (April 2, 1862 – before 1938) was a lawyer, writer, poet, and newspaper editor at the Peninsula News and Advertiser. He was the Progressive Party candidate for the Governor of Delaware in 1912.

Biography
He was born on April 2, 1862, to Garrett Lee Hynson and Ellen Postles. He taught elocution at the University of Pennsylvania in 1897.  He was the author of the state song, Our Delaware. He was buried in the Odd Fellows Cemetery in Delaware.

Publications
The Practical Treatment of Stammering and Stuttering: With Suggestions for Practice and Helpful Exercises (1902) with George Andrew Lewis
 Advanced Elocution (1896) with Mrs. J. W. Shoemaker and John Hendricks Bechtel

References

1862 births
Year of death missing
University of Pennsylvania faculty
American rhetoricians
Delaware lawyers
Delaware Progressives (1912)
Writers from Delaware